The women's 100 metres hurdles event at the 1990 Commonwealth Games was held on 1 and 2 February at the Mount Smart Stadium in Auckland.

Medalists

Results

Heats
Qualification: First 4 of each heat (Q) and the next 1 fastest (q) qualified for the final.

Wind:Heat 1: +2.3 m/s, Heat 2: +3.4 m/s

Final
Wind: +1.8 m/s

References

100
1990
1990 in women's athletics